John Harlow may refer to:

 John Martyn Harlow (1819–1907), American physician to head-injury survivor Phineas Gage
 John Harlow (director) (1896–1977), British film director
 John Harlow, former member of band Coachwhips